Balkan Elite Road Classics is a one-day road cycling race held annually since 2016. It is part of UCI Europe Tour in category 1.2.

Winners

References

Cycle races in Albania
UCI Europe Tour races
Recurring sporting events established in 2016
Summer events in Albania